CCCC Miami Towers is the preliminary name for a mixed-use project being planned in the Brickell neighborhood of Miami, Florida, United States. The site is bounded by South Miami Avenue to the east, SW 14th Terrace to the south, SW 1st Avenue to the west, and SW 14th Street to the north. The site broke ground in 2006 and was excavated for a previous project that stalled known as Capital at Brickell. It was revived in 2014 by China City Construction Corp, an affiliate of China Communications Construction Company.

History

Capital at Brickell

Capital at Brickell was a proposed complex of two skyscrapers. The project was cancelled due to financial reasons caused by the Great Recession. The complex was to consist of two towers made up of residential, office, a hotel and retail, "Capital at Brickell Tower I" and "Capital at Brickell Tower II."

Tower I was to be 53 floors and Tower II was to be 57 floors. Although not the tallest buildings proposed during the first Miami "Manhattanization wave" from 2006-2008, the towers were planned to be some of the more striking architecturally, and would have surpassed the Four Seasons Hotel Miami as the city's tallest building, but not the Panorama Tower completed in 2017. Both towers were designed to be reminiscent of the Chrysler Building in New York City. The tops of the buildings were especially similar, with a "crown" at the top of each building and a similar spire. The towers were part of the recent push to build more skyscrapers in the western side of the Brickell neighborhood, which does not border Biscayne Bay as does most of Downtown.

The architect of the complex was Fullerton-Diaz Architects, Inc. The developer was Cabi Developers, led by VP of Development Miroslav "Misha" Mladenovic. In July 2011, two developers began competing for the lot.

CCCC Miami

In December 2014, the site was sold to Chinese developers for US$74.74 million, who plan a redesign. In 2015 it was revealed that they were aiming to build the tallest building in Miami and that it could be largely office space, though it would be mixed-use. They are seeking EB-5 funding, similar to Panorama Tower, to cover part of the expected $875 million cost.

Mast Capital
In the 2020 is the project was revived by Mast Capital as a three tower development with the tallest, Cipriani, being about 900 ft.

See also
 List of tallest buildings in Miami

References

External links
 Capital at Brickell on Emporis
 Tower I on Emporis
 Tower II on Emporis

Skyscrapers in Miami
Twin towers